Segal's law is an adage that states:

The mood of the saying is ironic.  While at a surface level it appears to be advocating the simplicity and self-consistency obtained by relying on information from only a single source, the underlying message is to gently question and make fun of such apparent certainty – a man with one watch can't really be sure he knows the right time, he merely has no way to identify error or uncertainty.

Nevertheless, the saying is also used in its purely surface sense, to caution against the potential pitfalls of having too much potentially conflicting information when making a decision.

History
Supposedly, the saying was coined by the San Diego Union on September 20, 1930: "Confusion.—Retail jewelers assert that every man should carry two watches. But a man with one watch knows what time it is, and a man with two watches could never be sure." Later this was — mistakenly — attributed to Lee Segall of KIXL, then to be misquoted again by Arthur Bloch as "Segal's Law".

See also
List of chronometers on HMS Beagle
The four-faced liar
Triple modular redundancy in chronometers
wikt:a stopped clock is right twice a day

References

External links

Adages